Miguel Isaac Chilemba Zuze (born 17 May 1987) is a Malawian professional boxer who held the IBO super-middleweight title from 2010 to 2011, and challenged for the WBA (Undisputed), IBF, and WBO light-heavyweight titles in 2016.

Early professional career
Chilemba made his professional debut in Gauteng, South Africa on 19 October 2005 defeating Thamsanga Tindleni in the 2nd round of a 4 round contest.  He compiled a run of eight successive victories before dropping a points decision to Willbeforce Shihepo on 5 July 2007 at the Emperor's Palace in Gauteng.  The reverse to Shihepo was immediately rectified in his next fight, again in Gauteng, on 21 November 2007 defeating Shihepo on points over six rounds.  Two more fights followed in 2008 resulting in wins over David Basajjamivule and Chamunorowa Gonorenda before Chilemba got the opportunity to fight for the African Boxing Unions super middleweight championship on 13 September 2008.  The fight for the title once again took place at the Emperor's Palace and pitched Chilemba against the experienced former Commonwealth champion Charles Adamu with Chilemba winning the fight with a 12 round decision to lift the title.

Championship fights
In his next fight Chilemba stepped up to light heavyweight and challenged former victim David Basajjamivule for the WBO version of the light heavyweight title.  The fight at the Graceland Casino in Mpumalanga took place on 13 June 2009 and resulted in a second victory over the Ugandan. Chilemba followed this up on 31 October 2009 with another title win, this time defeating French based Congolese fighter Doudou Ngumbu to lift the African Boxing Union's light heavyweight version as well as the WBC International title. A first defence of the WBC title was due to have been made on 26 March 2010 with the Malawian travelling to England to meet former British champion Tony Oakey on a Ricky Hatton promoted bill.  The fight however never materialised after Oakey lost an English title fight to fellow countryman Danny McIntosh. Following Oakey, the next opponent lined up for Chilemba was to be Rupert van Aswegen but he then chose to retire from the sport altogether leaving the Malawian once again without an opponent.

IBO World Title
Following the pullout, Chilemba moved back down at super middleweight for the chance to fight undefeated Australian Michael Bolling on 19 June 2010 for the vacant IBO world title. The fight at the Emperor's Palace, resulted in another win for the Malawian and was his fourth title fight in a row in which a different title had been on the line. Chilemba made the first defence of his IBO belt on 6 November 2010 returning to the Emperors Palace and retaining with a gruelling draw against touted South African Thomas Oosthuizen despite being the underdog going into the fight. On 25 February 2011 Chilemba travelled to Tulsa, Oklahoma to fight in the United States for the first time.  His opponent, the unbeaten Russian Maxim Vlasov had won all 19 of his previous fights and managed to knock Chilemba down twice in the 8th round.  Despite this the Malawian was able to win the fight over the 10 round distance.

Chilemba vs. Meroro 
Chilemba returned to South Africa for his next fight against Namibian boxer Vikapita Meroro and retained the WBC International light heavyweight title on 26 March 2011 with a unanimous points win.

Chilemba vs. Bivol 
On August 4, 2018, Chilemba challenged Dmitry Bivol for his WBA light heavyweight belt. Bivol landed 34.5% of his punches compared to Chiilemba's 15.5% and all three judges saw Bivol as the clear winner, scoring the fight 120-108, 120-108 and 112-112 for the champion.

Professional boxing record

References

External links
 

1987 births
Living people
Super-middleweight boxers
Light-heavyweight boxers
Malawian male boxers
African Boxing Union champions
International Boxing Organization champions
People from Blantyre
Malawian emigrants to South Africa
South African male boxers